Operation Groundhog was reported a joint US/Kazakh/Russian program to secure radioactive residues of Soviet-era nuclear bomb tests. In 2003, reports appeared in Science Magazine that the program included paving some areas with thick layers of reinforced concrete to protect plutonium contaminating the ground, in order to prevent terrorists from acquiring contaminated material for making a dirty bomb.

References

See also 
Cactus Dome

Radioactive waste